Richard "Ribbs" Gibbs (born December 5, 1955) is an American film composer and music producer whose credits include Dr. Dolittle,  Big Momma's House, Queen of the Damned, the television series Battlestar Galactica and the first season of The Simpsons.

Musical career

Gibbs was the keyboard player for the new wave band Oingo Boingo from 1980 to 1984. He was also a session player, performing on over 150 albums for artists as diverse as War, Tom Waits, Boy Meets Girl, Living in a Box, Robert Palmer, and Aretha Franklin. His professional relationship with Mr. Palmer began after he wrote a tongue-in-cheek letter of complaint about loud music emanating from Palmer's Bahamian condo, which was immediately next door to the one Gibbs was staying in while working on another project at Compass Point studios.

Gibbs started with Michael Jochum the band Zuma II, which had an eponymously titled record released by Pasha/CBS Records. He has appeared live with Korn, The Staples, Chaka Khan, and Oingo Boingo.

Like his former bandmate Danny Elfman, Gibbs has embarked on a life of scoring movies and television shows. He has written the scores for over sixty films that have collectively grossed well over $1 billion in box office receipts worldwide (Dr. Dolittle, Step Into Liquid, Say Anything... and Queen of the Damned, among others) and acted as musical director and composer for various television shows, including Muppets Tonight!, The Simpsons, and Battlestar Galactica. He has worked extensively with actress-comedian Tracey Ullman, on her various projects.

His critically well-received collaboration with Jonathan Davis (lead singer of Korn) on the songs and score for Queen of the Damned led to a gold record.

Gibbs produced the second full-length record for the Warner Bros. Records band Eisley, "Combinations." Pre-production took place in Tyler, TX, home of the band, and tracking took place in Malibu in his studio The Woodshed in mid-September 2006. The record was released on August 14, 2007. He also found the time to serve as music director and arranger for Korn's appearance on MTV Unplugged, broadcast in February 2007. He produced the record of that event, which arrived in February as well.

Past projects include scoring the multiple award winning drama Face to Face for Battlestar Galactica and Queen of the Damned director Michael Rymer. He produced former Mr. Mister (Broken Wings) band member Richard Page's solo disc "Peculiar Life" and is currently producing a collection of songs by an adventurous new band, Purple Mountains Majesties.

He consistently works with directors Betty Thomas (Dr. Dolittle, 28 Days, I Spy), John Schultz (Judy Moody and the Not Bummer Summer, Like Mike, The Honeymooners), along with the aforementioned Michael Rymer, and Tracey Ullman.

Gibbs' songwriting and theme credits include "Until the Stars Fall" (co-written and produced with Mark Hoppus of Blink-182 for the movie Fired Up!), the theme to the re-imagined Battlestar Galactica series, the Muppets Tonight! theme, and the aforementioned Queen of the Damned songs. The Queen of the Damned songs were co-written and produced with Jonathan Davis; the songs were reperformed for the CD release by Chester Bennington (Linkin Park), Marilyn Manson, David Draiman (Disturbed), Jay Gordon (Orgy), and Wayne Static (Static-X).

Woodshed Recording 
Gibbs is the owner of a state of the art ocean view Malibu studio, Woodshed Recording. Since 2004, Woodshed has hosted artists and producers such as Barbra Streisand, U2, Sting, Pink, Lenny Kravitz, Max Martin, Foster the People, Coldplay, Ryan Tedder, Paul Epworth, Walter Afanasieff, and Kenny 'Babyface' Edmonds. Woodshed features a revolutionary modular wall system that allows for dozens of different studio configurations, allowing Woodshed to accommodate small intimate bands as well as larger ensembles.

Composers Breakfast Club 
The Composers Breakfast Club was formed by Richard Gibbs in 2013. It began as a means to connect, enjoy a meal together with friends and explore all aspects of the world of music, whilst slowly inviting more friends to join in the camaraderie. Similar to The Socrates School and the Inklings, The Composers Breakfast Club is dedicated to connecting musicians with other musicians and creating a space for critical thinking and debate about our current world.

The CBC has expanded unabated to this day yet continues to adhere to the original basis of its founding - friends helping friends. They added featured presenters every week, from illustrious music makers to thought leaders in science, politics, business and beyond. Rather than expanding the weekly group well past their average of 65 attendees (and hence losing intimacy), the CBC has added additional chapters that meet in other parts of greater Los Angeles on other days of the week (Venice, Agoura, and Silver Lake) and a chapter in Nashville and the rumblings of a new one in New York City.

All are invited to attend and partake. Being a composer is not a requirement - indeed, many regulars are actors, singers, engineers, producers, and even the odd architect or two. Name tags will always be verboten, and smiles and helping hands are always welcome.

Armory of Harmony 
Gibbs is the founder of Armory of Harmony, a nonprofit which facilitates the creation of musical instruments from decommissioned firearms and distributes those instruments to high school and college marching bands and ensembles.

Invisible Arts 
In 2020, Gibbs created invisible arts, a podcasts series telling the stories Gibbs has accumulated over a lifetime in the music industry. He tells stories about his time working with artists such as Tracey Ullman, Robert Palmer, Danny Elfman, Tim Curry, and many more.

Personal life
Gibbs earned an Associate of Arts degree from Daytona Beach Community College while still enrolled as a senior in high school. He went on to matriculate with bachelor's degree in classical composition from Boston's Berklee College of Music before moving to California. He and his wife Linda have three children, Keegan Gibbs, Riley Gibbs and Katelin Gibbs.

Filmography

Awards

BMI Film and TV Awards

DVD Exclusive Awards

See also
 Music of Battlestar Galactica (reimagining)

References

External links
 Official Richard Gibbs Website (requires Flash Player 6 and QuickTime 5 as minimum)
 
 Can a 'Day of Sharing' save the music industry? - The Christian Science Monitor, February 25, 2008. Retrieved on February 25, 2008
 Woodshed Recording - Richard Gibbs recording studio
 https://www.composersbreakfastclub.org/
 https://www.invisiblearts.com/

1955 births
American film score composers
American male film score composers
Berklee College of Music alumni
La-La Land Records artists
Living people
Musicians from Ohio
People from Bay Village, Ohio